Swami Rama Himalayan University (SRHU) is a private university about 25 kilometers southeast of Dehradun city and in close vicinity of Jolly Grant Airport, in the north Indian state of Uttarakhand. The university is named after revered Indian yogi Swami Rama.

History
In April 2012, a proposal for establishing a university was put before the Government of Uttarakhand by Himalayan Institute Hospital Trust. In December 2012 Uttarakhand Legislative Assembly passed the 'Himalayan University Bill, 2012' and in February 2013 it became an Act through the assent of Governor of Uttarakhand as Himalayan University Act, 2012 (Uttarakhand Adhiniyam Sankhya 12 of 2013). The first academic session of university was started from July 2013.

Academics

SRHU is a private university and its academic activities are organized through its four constituent colleges (faculties), which run undergraduate (UG), postgraduate (PG) and doctoral degree programs. The four schools are listed below.

Himalayan Institute of Medical Sciences (HIMS)
HIMS offers courses in medical and paramedical studies. Undergraduate courses include MBBS and postgraduate courses are MD in Anatomy, Physiology, Biochemistry, Pathology, Microbiology, Pharmacology, Community Medicine, General Medicine, Pediatrics, Skin (Dermatology, Venereology, and Leprosy), Radio Diagnosis, Anesthesiology, Pulmonary Medicine and Radiotherapy.

Himalayan College of Nursing (HCN)
Courses offered are Basic B.Sc. Nursing and Post Basic B.Sc. Nursing.

Himalayan School of Science & Technology (HSST)
Courses offered are Bachelor of Computer Applications, Bachelor of Technology in Civil Engineering, Computer Science & Engineering, Electronics & Communication Engineering, etc.

Himalayan School of Management Studies (HSMS)
MBA, B.Com Honours and BBA programs in specializations are offered by the School of Management Studies.

See also
Dehradun

References

External links
 Website of Swami Rama Himalayan University
 Uttarakhand Government website
 Website of Medical Council of India

Private universities in India
Universities in Uttarakhand
Education in Dehradun district
2012 establishments in Uttarakhand
Educational institutions established in 2012